Eybir Olmedo Bonaga Cerrud (born 19 May 1986) is a Panamanian football attacking midfielder, who currently plays for Santa Gema.

Club career
Bonaga came through the youth ranks at Atlético Chiriquí and moved to San Francisco in December 2010. In January 2012 he had a trial in Slovakia with Corgoň Liga side Ružomberok, but a move did not work out and he joined Colombian side Boyacá Chicó on loan instead.

International career
Bonaga made his debut for Panama in the UNCAF Nations Cup 2009 semi-finals entering as a last minute substitute against Honduras on 30 January 2009 and has, as of 1 May 2015, earned a total of 23 caps, scoring 1 goal. He represented his country in 2 FIFA World Cup qualification matches and played at the 2011 and 2013 CONCACAF Gold Cups. On 10 January 2013 he scored against Guatemala in a friendly in the 67th minute.

International goals
Scores and results list Panama's goal tally first.

Honors
National Teams
UNCAF Nations Cup Champions (1): 2009

References

External links

1986 births
Living people
People from David District
Association football midfielders
Panamanian footballers
Panama international footballers
2009 UNCAF Nations Cup players
2011 Copa Centroamericana players
2011 CONCACAF Gold Cup players
2013 Copa Centroamericana players
2013 CONCACAF Gold Cup players
Copa Centroamericana-winning players
Categoría Primera A players
Atlético Chiriquí players
San Francisco F.C. players
Boyacá Chicó F.C. footballers
Panamanian expatriate footballers
Expatriate footballers in Colombia